Incorporated Council of Law Reporting for England and Wales v Attorney-General, [1972] Ch 73, is a case in which the Court of Appeal held that the publication of the Law Reports series by the Incorporated Council of Law Reporting for England and Wales was within the charitable head of “advancement of education”.

1972 in British law
Court of Appeal (England and Wales) cases
1972 in case law
1972 in England
1972 in Wales